Ouislane (Berber: Wislan) is a town and municipality in Meknès Prefecture of the Fès-Meknès region of Morocco. The 2014 Moroccan census recorded a population of 87,910. At the time of the 2004 census, the commune had a total population of 47,824 people living in 9327 households.

References

Populated places in Meknès Prefecture
Municipalities of Morocco